The  opened in the grounds of the former Urado Castle in Katsurahama, Kōchi, Japan on 15 November 1991. The collection includes correspondence and other documents by Sakamoto Ryōma and his contemporaries and there is also a library of over two thousand books relating to the Meiji Restoration.

See also
 Bakumatsu
 Ryōma's Birthplace Memorial Museum

References

External links
 
 
 

Meiji Restoration
Museums in Kōchi Prefecture
Prefectural museums
Biographical museums in Japan
History museums in Japan
Museums established in 1991
1991 establishments in Japan
Postmodern architecture in Japan
Kōchi